The 1935–36 Panhellenic Championship was the seventh season of the highest football league of Greece.

It was held as a national category, in which 8 (out of 10) teams from the 3 founding Associations of the HFF, that had participated in the 2 groups of the previous season's Semi-final round and resulted as follows:
Athenian Championship: The first 3 Athenian teams of the ranking in the 1934–35 Southern Group.
Piraeus' Championship: The 2 Piraeus' teams of the 1934–35 Southern Group.
Macedonian Championship: The first 3 Macedonian teams of the ranking in the 1934–35 Northern Group.
 
Those teams did not participate in their regional leagues in that season. The event started on October 26, 1935 and ended on June 14, 1936. Olympiacos emerged champion, having only a 4-1 defeat by Panathinaikos. The point system was: Win: 2 points - Draw: 1 point - Loss: 0 points.

League table

Results

Top scorers

References

External links
Rsssf 1935–36 championship

Panhellenic Championship seasons
Greece
1935–36 in Greek football